Bánk Bán is a 1914 silent Austro-Hungarian film directed by Michael Curtiz.

Cast
 László Bakó as Bánk Bán  
 Mihály Fekete as Mikhál bán
 Jenő Janovics as Biberach
 Mari Jászai as Gertrudis királyné
 István Szentgyörgyi as Tiborc
 Victor Varconi (as Mihály Várkonyi)
 Erzsi Paulay as Melinda
 Adorján Nagy as II. Endre király

See also
 Michael Curtiz filmography

References

External links
 

1914 films
Austrian black-and-white films
Hungarian black-and-white films
Austrian silent feature films
Hungarian silent feature films
Films directed by Michael Curtiz
Austro-Hungarian films